40 Años is a compilation album released by Marco Antonio Solís on September 2, 2016. This album celebrates 40 years of his historic musical career as an artist. It also includes songs from his time with Los Bukis.

Disc 1

All songs written and composed by Marco Antonio Solís except for El Perdedor

Disc 2

All songs written and composed by Marco Antonio Solís

Charts

Weekly charts

Year-end charts

References

2016 compilation albums
Marco Antonio Solís compilation albums